McCollum may refer to:

McCollum (surname), includes a list of people with the name
McCollum, Alabama, U.S., unincorporated community
McCollum Field, air field in Cobb County, Georgia, U.S.
McCollum High School, high school in San Antonio, Texas, U.S.
McCollum Hall, residence hall at the University of Kansas

See also